Li Dalong (born 21 October 1980) is a Chinese long jumper.

He won the silver medal at the 2002 Asian Games. He also competed at the 2003 World Indoor Championships without reaching the final.

His personal best jump is 8.22 metres, achieved in June 2001 in Baoding.

References

1980 births
Living people
Chinese male long jumpers
Asian Games medalists in athletics (track and field)
Athletes (track and field) at the 2002 Asian Games
Asian Games silver medalists for China
Medalists at the 2002 Asian Games
21st-century Chinese people